The Vigla Formation is an Early Cretaceous geologic formation in Albania and Greece.

Fossil content 
It contains radiolarian fossils dated to the late Barremian to middle Albian of the Cretaceous period.

See also 
 List of fossiliferous stratigraphic units in Albania
 Kalur Chert
 Han-Bulog Formation
 List of fossiliferous stratigraphic units in Greece

References

Further reading 
 T. Danelian, F. Baudin, S. Gardin, E. Masure, C. Ricordel, I. Fili, T. Mecaj and K. Mustaq. 2007. The record of mid Cretaceous oceanic anoxic events from the Ionian zone of southern Albania. Revue de Micropaléontologie 50(3):225-237
 T. Danelian, H. Tsikos, S. Gardin, F. Baudin, J.-P. Bellier and L. Emmanuel. 2004. Global and regional palaeoceanographic changes as recorded in the mid-Cretaceous (Aptian-Albian) sequence of the Ionian zone (NW Greece). Journal of the Geological Society 161:703-709

Geologic formations of Albania
Geologic formations of Greece
Lower Cretaceous Series of Europe
Albian Stage
Aptian Stage
Barremian Stage
Chert
Limestone formations
Shale formations
Deep marine deposits
Paleontology in Albania
Paleontology in Greece